Robert C. Deming (born 1935 or 1936) is a former American football player, coach, and college athletics administrator.  He served as the head football coach at The State University of Buffalo in 1969 and 1970, compiling a record of 8–12.  Deming was the athletic director at Ithaca College from 1980 until his retirement in 1997.

Head coaching record

References

1930s births
Living people
American football fullbacks
Buffalo Bulls athletic directors
Buffalo Bulls football coaches
Colgate Raiders athletic directors
Colgate Raiders football coaches
Colgate Raiders football players
Ithaca Bombers athletic directors